Martin McDonogh (1858 – 24 November 1934) was an Irish politician.

Early life
Born in Gorumna, Connemara, to Thomas McDonogh and Honoria Hernon, McDonogh was the second son of six children who survived to adulthood. He was a cousin of the writer and journalist, Pádraic Ó Conaire. He was educated by the Jesuits at Coláiste Iognáid and later at St Stanislaus College in Tullabeg, County Offaly. He briefly studied law at University College Galway.

Business career
McDonogh inherited his father's company, Thomas McDonogh & Sons, and expanded it to become one of the biggest employers in the province of Connacht. At its height, the company employed 700 people in an array of business ventures from a fertilizer factory to farming and electricity generation. A strict teetotaller, he never married. 
 

McDonogh was known for being violently opposed to trade unions. He was the leader of the Galway Employers' Federation during the lockout of 1912 and the five-week general workers strike of 1913.

Political career
McDonogh was first elected to Dáil Éireann as a Cumann na nGaedheal Teachta Dála (TD) for the Galway constituency at the June 1927 general election. He was re-elected at the September 1927 general election but lost his seat at the 1932 general election. He re-gained his seat at the 1933 general election, but died during the 8th Dáil in 1934. The by-election caused by his death was held on 19 June 1935 and was won by Eamon Corbett of Fianna Fáil.

He never married, and lived at Belmore, Salthill, County Galway, where he died on 24 November 1934. He was buried at Fonthill cemetery, Galway.

Further reading
Jackie Uí Chionna, He was Galway: Máirtín Mór McDonogh, 1860–1934, Four Courts Press.

References

1858 births
1934 deaths
Cumann na nGaedheal TDs
Fine Gael TDs
Politicians from County Galway
Members of the 5th Dáil
Members of the 6th Dáil
Members of the 8th Dáil